Kimberly Buyl (born 11 September 1988) is a road cyclist from Belgium. She participated at the 2012 UCI Road World Championships in the Women's team time trial for Sengers Ladies Cycling Team.

References

External links
 profile at Procyclingstats.com

1988 births
Belgian female cyclists
Living people
Place of birth missing (living people)
People from Asse
Cyclists from Flemish Brabant
21st-century Belgian women
21st-century Belgian people